The  mile was a track cycling event held as part of the Cycling at the 1904 Summer Olympics programme.  It was the only time this  event was held at the Olympics.  16 American cyclists competed.  The names of 2 of the competitors are not known.

Results

Heats

The top two finishers in each heat advanced to the semifinals.  The identities of 2 of the 4 cyclists who placed fourth in each heat are unknown, though Joel N. McCrea and Oscar Schwab are known to have raced and so are the other 2 fourth-place finishers; which heat each raced in is not known.

Semifinals

The top two finishers in each semifinal advanced to the final.

Final

References

Sources

 

Cycling at the 1904 Summer Olympics
Track cycling at the 1904 Summer Olympics
Olympic track cycling events